Hagakure (meaning Hidden by the Leaves or Hidden Leaves), or , is a practical and spiritual guide for a warrior, drawn from a collection of commentaries by the clerk Yamamoto Tsunetomo, former retainer to Nabeshima Mitsushige (July 10, 1632 – July 2, 1700), the third ruler of what is now Saga Prefecture in Japan. Tashiro Tsuramoto compiled these commentaries from his conversations with Tsunetomo from 1709 to 1716; however, it was not published until many years afterwards. Written during a time when there was no officially sanctioned samurai fighting, the book grapples with the dilemma of maintaining a warrior class in the absence of war and reflects the author's nostalgia for a world that had disappeared before he was born. Hagakure was largely forgotten for two centuries after its composition, but it came to be viewed as the definitive guide of the armed forces of the Empire of Japan during the Pacific War. Hagakure is also known as The Book of the Samurai, Analects of Nabeshima or Hagakure Analects.

Content
The book records Yamamoto's views on bushido, the warrior code of the samurai. Hagakure is sometimes said to assert that bushido is really the "Way of Dying" or living as though one was already dead, and that a samurai must be willing to die at any moment in order to be true to his lady/lord. His saying "the way of the warrior is death" was a summation of the willingness to sacrifice that bushido codified. Hagakures text is occasionally misinterpreted as meaning that bushido is a code of death. However, the true meaning is that by having a constant awareness of death, people can achieve a transcendent state of freedom, whereby "it is possible to perfectly fulfill one's calling as a warrior."

Historical context
After the Tokugawa shogunate suppressed the Shimabara Rebellion in 1638, Japan experienced no warfare for about two centuries. Private feuding and dueling between samurai was also suppressed. Yamamoto Tsunetomo was born in 1659, after the end of officially sanctioned samurai fighting. He had no personal combat experience and when he was employed, he worked as a scribe. By the late 1600s and early 1700s, samurai faced the dilemma of maintaining a warrior class in the absence of war, and Hagakure reflects this uncertainty. Written late in the author's life, the book also reflects his nostalgia for a world that had disappeared before his birth.

Reception
Hagakure was largely forgotten for two centuries. The first modern edition appeared in 1900, and it did not receive much attention during the first decades of the century. Hagakure came to be viewed as a definitive book of the samurai only during the Pacific War. According to Mark Ravina, "Rather than an account of samurai tradition, this work serves as an example of what the Japanese army thought Japanese soldiers should believe about samurai practice." In the post-war era, the nationalist author and poet, Yukio Mishima, was inspired by Hagakure and wrote his own book in praise of the work. Quotations from Hagakure are used as a narrative device in the 1999 American gangster film Ghost Dog: The Way of the Samurai.

Editions
 Hagakure: The Secret Wisdom of the Samurai, Yamamoto Tsunetomo, Translated by Alexander Bennett, Tuttle Publishing, 2014,  (Full Translation)
 The Art of the Samurai: Yamamoto Tsunetomo's Hagakure, Yamamoto Tsunetomo, Translated by Barry D. Steben, Duncan Baird, September 2008,  (Partial translation)
 Hagakure, The Way of the Samurai, Yamamoto Tsunetomo, Translated by Takao Mukoh, Angkor Verlag, 2000 (Reprint), 
 Hagakure, The manga edition, Yamamoto Tsunetomo, Translated by William Scott Wilson, a comic book/manga version, adapted by Sean Michael Wilson and Chie Kutsuwada, Kondansha International Ltd., 2011. 
 Bushido, The Way of the Samurai, Yamamoto Tsunetomo, Translated by Justin F. Stone and Minoru Tanaka, Square One Publishers, 2003,

References

Further reading

 Inventing the Way of the Samurai: Nationalism, Internationalism, and Bushido in Modern Japan, by Oleg Benesch. Oxford: Oxford University Press, 2014. , .
  Hagakure Nyūmon The Way of the Samurai: Yukio Mishima on Hagakure in modern life 1967 Translated by Kathryn Sparling, 1977, .
 On Hagakure, by celebrated Japanese novelist Yukio Mishima.
 The Code of the Samurai: A Modern Translation of the Bushido Shoshinshu of Taira Shigesuke by Thomas Cleary, Tuttle Publishing, 1999. .
 Hagakure: Spirit of Bushido, by Hideo Koga and Stacey B. Day. Hagakure Society, Saga, Japan, 1993. (University of Kyushu Press, Fukuoka, Japan).  C1012.
 The Wisdom of Hagakure: Way of the Samurai of Saga Domain, by Stacey B. Day and Kiyoshi Inokuchi. Hagakure Society, Saga, Japan, 1994. (University of Kyushu Press, Fukuoka, Japan). .
 Moudrost Samuraju: Zivotni Stezka Samuraje Z Kraje Saga, by Stacey B. Day and Kijosi Inokuci. (Prelozila Marketa Cukrova). Trigon, Praha, CZ, 1998. .

External links

 Hagakure Kikigaki : Orated Aphorisms of Yamamoto Jocho
 佐賀大学電子図書館 小城鍋島文庫
 “In the Shade of the Leaves”, a revised selection
 Hagakure Quotes & Passages

Japanese aesthetics
Japanese books
Japanese philosophy
Ethics books
Samurai
Warrior code
Codes of conduct
Edo-period works
Japanese philosophy books